Donald McWhinnie (16 October 1920 – 8 October 1987) was a BBC executive and later a radio, television, and stage director.

Educated at Rotherham Grammar School, McWhinnie worked for the BBC in administrative roles in the 1940s and 1950s and was drama Script Editor from 1951 to 1953. In the later 1950s, he became a radio director, and from the 1960s to the 1980s he was a director of television drama.

McWhinnie, Frederick Bradnum, and Desmond Briscoe together established the BBC Radiophonic Workshop. In 1959, McWhinnie directed a production of Embers, a radio play by Samuel Beckett. First broadcast on the BBC Third Programme on 24 June 1959, the play won the RAI prize at the Prix Italia awards later that year. McWhinnie wrote about his approach to radio drama in The art of radio.

In 1962, McWhinnie was nominated for a Tony Award for his screen version of Harold Pinter's The Caretaker.

In 1965, he directed the first Broadway theatre production of the Bill Naughton comedy All in Good Time, which opened at the Royale Theatre, New York, on 18 February 1965 and closed on 27 March 1965. It starred Donald Wolfit, Marjorie Rhodes, and Richard Dysart.

The inaugural episode of the BBC Television Shakespeare in December 1978 was announced to be Much Ado About Nothing, directed by McWhinnie and starring Penelope Keith and Michael York. The episode was shot at a cost of £250,000, edited, and announced as the first of the series, but then was suddenly pulled from the schedule and replaced with Romeo and Juliet. No reasons were given by the BBC, although newspaper reports suggested the episode had been postponed for re-shoots, due to worries that an actor's "very heavy accent" would be a problem for US audiences. However, there were no reshoots, the episode was abandoned and was later replaced by a new adaptation. It appears that the BBC management regarded the production as a failure.

In 1981, McWhinnie was nominated for the Laurence Olivier Award for Best Director for Translations.

Selected credits as director
BBC television adaptation of Evelyn Waugh's Sword of Honour (1967)
 Moll Flanders (ITV TV series, 1975)
Wings (BBC TV series, 1978)
Tales of the Unexpected, episode "William and Mary" (1979)
Love in a Cold Climate (Thames Television serial, 1980)
Mapp and Lucia (Original and best TV series 1985-1986)

Radio Plays 
 18.06.56 Giles Cooper -Mathry Beacon
 13.01.57 Samuel Beckett - All That Fall
 15.08.57 Giles Cooper - The Disagreeable Oyster
 14.12.57 Samuel Beckett - From an Adandoned Work
 13.01.58 Giles Cooper - Without the Grail
 03.08.58 Giles Cooper - Under the Loofah Tree
 23.11.58 Giles Cooper - Unman, Wittering and Zigo
 09.02.59 James Hanley, Leo McKern, Jack MacGowran - The Ocean
 24.06.59 Samuel Beckett - Embers
 ??.07.59 Harold Pinter - A Slight Ache
 06.10.59 James Hanley - Gobbet
 25.02.60 Harold Pinter - A Night Out
 1960s Robert Bolt - The Drunken Sailor
 06.10.64 Samuel Beckett - Cascando
 1973 McWhinnie/Hilda Lawrence - The Hands

Stage 
 1960 The Duchess of Malfi (RSC)
 1961 The Caretaker (Samuel Beckett) - Broadway
 1962 A Passage to India - Broadway
 1963 Rattle of a Simple Man - Broadway
 1965 All in Good Time - Broadway
 1967 The Astrakhan Coat (Pauline Macaulay) - Broadway
 1983 Lovers Dancing, Starring Paul Eddington, Colin Blakely, Georgina Hale, Jane Carr - The Albery Theatre

Notes

External links
 https://www.rsc.org.uk/the-duchess-of-malfi/1960-2000-productions
 http://www.suttonelms.org.uk/donald-mcwhinnie.html
 http://archive.spectator.co.uk/article/12th-november-1983/34/theatre
 

1920 births
1987 deaths
BBC executives
BBC Radio drama directors
British television directors
People educated at Rotherham Grammar School
20th-century British businesspeople